Music of Hispaniola may refer to:

 Music of Haiti
 Music of the Dominican Republic